The women's moguls competition of the FIS Freestyle Ski and Snowboarding World Championships 2017 was held at Sierra Nevada, Spain on March 9 (qualifying and finals).
31 athletes from 15 countries competed.

Bracket 

The following are the results of the competition.

Finals

Top Half

Bottom Half

References

Dual moguls, women's